The Seventh Decade: The New Shape of Nuclear Danger is a 2007 book by Jonathan Schell.  It is described as a provocative book which explores the threat posed by some new nuclear policies of the United States.

Schell argues that "a revolution in nuclear affairs has occurred under the watch of the Bush administration", including a historic embrace of a first-strike policy and the development of new generations of nuclear weapons. Schell contends that this policy has provoked weapons proliferation in Iran, North Korea, and elsewhere; accelerated global trafficking in nuclear weapons; and advanced nuclear terrorism.

References

Further reading
 
 
 

2007 non-fiction books
Books about politics of the United States
Books about nuclear issues
Books about terrorism
Metropolitan Books books